Julien Beke (11 February 1914 – January 1992) was a Belgian wrestler. He competed in the men's freestyle welterweight at the 1936 Summer Olympics.

References

External links
 

1914 births
1992 deaths
Belgian male sport wrestlers
Olympic wrestlers of Belgium
Wrestlers at the 1936 Summer Olympics
Sportspeople from Ghent